Reinhard Bredow (aka Reinhard Bredlow, born 6 April 1947 in Ilsenburg) is an East German former luger who competed in the late 1960s and early 1970s. He and Horst Hörnlein won the gold medal in the men's doubles event (shared with the Italian pairing of Walter Plaikner and Paul Hildgartner) at the 1972 Winter Olympics in Sapporo.

Bredow also won four medals in the men's doubles event at the FIL World Luge Championships with one gold (1973), one silver (1969), and two bronzes (1970, 1971). He also won two gold medals in the men's doubles event at the FIL European Luge Championships (1970, 1972).

References

 

1947 births
Living people
People from Ilsenburg
German male lugers
Lugers at the 1968 Winter Olympics
Lugers at the 1972 Winter Olympics
Olympic medalists in luge
Medalists at the 1972 Winter Olympics
Olympic gold medalists for East Germany
Sportspeople from Saxony-Anhalt